Greatest Hits is the first greatest hits collection released in 1988 by the American country music duo The Judds. It features the singles "Give a Little Love" and "Change of Heart."

Track listing
"Why Not Me" (Harlan Howard, Sonny Throckmorton, Brent Maher) – 3:31
"Rockin' with the Rhythm of the Rain" (Maher, Don Schlitz) – 2:41
"Mama He's Crazy" (Kenny O'Dell) – 3:14
"Give a Little Love" (Paul Kennerley) – 3:51
"Grandpa (Tell Me 'Bout the Good Old Days)" (Jamie O'Hara) – 4:15
"Girls Night Out" (Maher, Jeffrey Bullock) – 2:54
"Change of Heart" (Naomi Judd) – 3:35
"Have Mercy" (Kennerley) – 3:22
"Cry Myself to Sleep" (Kennerley) – 3:42
"Love Is Alive" (Kent Robbins) – 4:01

Track listing (European version)
"Why Not Me" (Harlan Howard, Sonny Throckmorton, Brent Maher) – 3:31
"Rockin' with the Rhythm of the Rain" (Maher, Don Schlitz) – 2:41
"Mama He's Crazy" (Kenny O'Dell) – 3:14
"Give a Little Love" (Paul Kennerley) – 3:51
"Grandpa (Tell Me 'Bout the Good Ol' Days)" (Jamie O'Hara) – 4:15
"I Know Where I'm Going" (Schlitz, Craig Bickhardt, Maher) – 3:39
"Don't Be Cruel" (Otis Blackwell, Elvis Presley) 2:29
"John Deere Tractor" (Lawrence John Hammond) – 3:31
"Have Mercy" (Kennerley) – 3:22
"Change of Heart" (Naomi Judd) – 3:35
"Girls' Night Out" (Maher, Jeff H. Bullock) – 2:54
"Cry Myself to Sleep" (Kennerley) – 3:42
"Love Is Alive" (Kent Robbins) – 4:01
"Maybe Your Baby's Got the Blues" (Troy Seals, Graham Lyle) – 3:32
"Had a Dream (For the Heart)" (Dennis Linde) – 3:12
"Turn It Loose" (Schlitz, Bickhardt, Maher) – 3:44

Personnel

The Judds
 Naomi Judd - vocals
 Wynonna Judd - vocals

Additional Musicians
 Eddie Bayers - drums
 Mark Casstevens - acoustic guitar
 Sonny Garrish - dobro, pedal steel guitar
 John Barlow Jarvis - piano
 Kirk "Jelly Roll" Johnson - harmonica
 Brent Maher - background vocals
 Bobby Ogdin - piano
 Don Potter - acoustic guitar, electric guitar, background vocals
 Gene Sisk - piano
 Larry Strickland - background vocals
 Jack Williams - bass guitar

Charts

Weekly charts

Year-end charts

Certifications

References

1988 greatest hits albums
The Judds compilation albums
Curb Records compilation albums
RCA Records compilation albums
Albums produced by Brent Maher